The 2010 FIBA Under-17 World Championship for Women (French: Championnat du monde FIBA des moins de 17 ans 2010) was an international basketball competition, held in Toulouse and Rodez, France from July 16–25, 2010. It was the first edition of the Women's Under-17 World Championships.

Qualification
2009 FIBA Africa Under-16 Championship for Women

2009 FIBA Asia Under-16 Championship for Women

2009 FIBA Americas Under-16 Championship for Women

2009 FIBA Europe Under-16 Championship for Women

2009 FIBA Oceania Under-16 Championship for Women

Host country

Groups

Preliminary round

Times given below are in CEST (UTC+2).

Group A

Group B

Knockout round

Championship

Quarterfinals

Semifinals

Bronze medal game

Final

5th–8th playoffs

5th–8th semifinals

7th place playoff

5th place playoff

9th–12th playoffs

9th–12th semifinals

11th place playoff

9th place playoff

Final standings

Awards

All-Tournament Team

Statistical leaders

Points

Rebounds

Assists

Blocks

Steals

References

External links
 Official Site

2010
2010 in women's basketball
2010–11 in French basketball
International women's basketball competitions hosted by France
International youth basketball competitions hosted by France
Sport in Toulouse
2010 in youth sport